Compensation may refer to:
Financial compensation
Compensation (chess), various advantages a player has in exchange for a disadvantage
Compensation (essay), by Ralph Waldo Emerson
Compensation (film), a 2000 film
Compensation (psychology)
Biological compensation, the characteristic pattern of bending of the plant or mushroom stem after turning from the normal vertical position

See also
"Compensating", a song by Aminé from his 2020 album Limbo